The Coast Alliance (Spanish: Alianza Costeña - AC) was a regional Nicaraguan political coalition of five parties founded in 1997 in opposition to the Constitutionalist Liberal Party and the Sandinista National Liberation Front. The members of the coalition were:

Nicaraguan Democratic Movement (MDN)
Independent Liberal Party (PLI)
Nicaraguan Resistance Party (PRN)
Conservative Party (PC)
Coast People’s Party (PPC)

The AC contested in the 1998 Atlantic Coast Regional Elections and won 2 seats (out of 45) in the RAAS Regional Council.

References

Political parties established in 1997
Defunct political parties in Nicaragua
Political party alliances in Nicaragua